The 1979 UK & Ireland Greyhound Racing Year was the 53rd year of greyhound racing in the United Kingdom and Ireland.

Roll of honour

Summary
The National Greyhound Racing Club (NGRC) released the annual returns, with totalisator turnover down, at £70,685,971 and attendances up, recorded at 6,585,491 from 5712 meetings. White City remains the top earner with an average meeting tote turnover of £55,677, some £5,000 more than closest rival Walthamstow Stadium.

		
Desert Pilot, a white and brindle dog and Kilmagoura Mist, a brindle bitch, were voted joint Greyhound of the Year. Desert Pilot won the Select Stakes and Wembley Summer Cup, Kilmagoura Mist won the St Leger. Sarahs Bunny, a kennelmate of Desert Pilot  won the 1979 English Greyhound Derby.

Tracks
Three tracks closed, Rochester (4 October), Halifax and the Horton Road Stadium in Gloucester (6 July).

News
The BGRF (British Greyhound Racing Federation) went into voluntary liquidation, the organisation body that had only been formed in 1977 between the NGRC and track promoters had been a disaster. Bizarrely despite the financial losses of the body a new replacement called the British Greyhound Racing Board was set up within months, with the aim to promote and elevate the greyhound racing industry, to improve the welfare and rules of racing.

Leeds closed their track kennels and lost three top trainers in the process, Joe Kelly, Tommy Brown and Jim Brennan (better known for his spell at Sheffield). Kelly was recruited by Racing Manager Terry Meynell and moved into the kennels of the late Harry Bamford, who had died aged just 40 while Brown and Brennan retired. Contracted trainers replacing them at Leeds were Pete Beaumont, Jim Brown and Ray Andrews. New Southend trainer Tom Lanceman also supplied runners for Ipswich, he was one of the first ever trainers to take up a dual attachment. Lanceman also trained the Grand National winner Topofthetide to a second successive win, the greyhound had won in 1978 for Tim Forster at odds on.

Lacca Champion was retired after the Derby and Joe De Mulder, former trainer and father of Geoff De Mulder died.

Competitions
A newcomer called Sports Promoter reared by Pat and Linda Mullins broke the track record over 400 metres at Cambridge in his first race  and went on to win the Romford Puppy Cup and Sporting Life Juvenile. The Olympic returned after an eight-year absence, the event was resurrected by Brighton.

John Honeysett won a closely fought Trainers Championship at Crayford after defeating John Coleman by just two points. Both had three winners on the night, Honeysett (Sandpiper Folly, Langford Dan, Triple Aspect), Coleman (Noble Brigg, Head Prefect, Our Rufus).

Ireland
The Bord na gCon announced a massive 60% hike in prize money. The grand re-opening of Galway was on 25 May, with the modernisation costing over £500,000.

Principal UK races

Totalisator returns

The totalisator returns declared to the licensing authorities for the year 1979 are listed below.

References 

Greyhound racing in the United Kingdom
Greyhound racing in the Republic of Ireland
UK and Ireland Greyhound Racing Year
UK and Ireland Greyhound Racing Year
UK and Ireland Greyhound Racing Year
UK and Ireland Greyhound Racing Year